Einar Pihl (1926/1927 – 2009) was a Swedish sprint canoeist who competed in the early to mid-1950s. He won three medals at the ICF Canoe Sprint World Championships with two golds (K-4 1000 m: 1950, K-4 10000 m: 1954) and a silver (K-4 1000 m: 1954).

References
Obituary
 

2009 deaths
Swedish male canoeists
1920s births
ICF Canoe Sprint World Championships medalists in kayak